SF Studios is a Swedish film and television production and distribution company (both Swedish and international) with headquarters in Stockholm and local offices in Oslo, Copenhagen, Helsinki and London. The studio is owned by Nordic media conglomerate, the Bonnier Group. The largest film studio in Sweden, it was established on 27 December 1919 as Aktiebolaget Svensk Filmindustri (AB Svensk Filmindustri) or Svensk Filmindustri (SF), and adopted its current name in 2016.

History
SF Studios was founded in 1919 through a merger between AB Svenska Biografteatern and Skandia Filmbyrå AB. From 1942 to 1961 Carl-Anders Dymling was the company's President. In 1946 the melodrama Sunshine Follows Rain was released, earning the studio's largest profit of the sound era. SF produced most of the films made by Ingmar Bergman, as well as a long list of films by other filmmakers such as Mauritz Stiller, Victor Sjöström, Carl Theodor Dreyer, Bo Widerberg, Lasse Hallström and Bille August. The majority of film adaptations of the works by children's author Astrid Lindgren have been produced by SF.

More recently, SF Studios has produced the Academy Award-nominated film A Man Called Ove. The studio produces film and tv-series and has production divisions in Sweden, Denmark, Norway and since 2017 in the United Kingdom. In 2020, SF Studios released its first international film production Horizon Line.

SF also distributes foreign films in the Nordic countries and has deals with Warner Bros., Metro-Goldwyn-Mayer, Sony Pictures and STX Entertainment in the United States and StudioCanal in France.

Since 1983 SF has been owned by the Bonnier Group. In 1998, SF was divided into two separate companies, the production and distribution company AB Svensk Filmindustri and the cinema chain SF Bio (later Filmstaden)

In 2020, SF had linked a distribution deal with Universal Pictures Home Entertainment to handle titles across the Nordic and Baltic regions.

See also
Filmstaden
SF Anytime
SF Bio
SF Film

References

Bibliography
 Gunnar Iverson, Astrid Soderbergh Widding & Tytti Soila. Nordic National Cinemas. Routledge, 2005.

Further reading
New York Times: American Rights to Swedish Film
Rocky Mountain News: Aspen theater wins rights to Ingmar Bergman film catalog
SF i tvist om sin filmkatalog i USA

External links

 
 SF Bio.se
 SF International Sales

Bonnier Group
Cinemas and movie theaters chains
Film distributors
Film production companies of Sweden
Swedish film studios
Mass media companies established in 1919
Swedish companies established in 1919
Companies based in Stockholm
1983 mergers and acquisitions
International sales agents